Matsushita Electric Industrial Co. v. Zenith Radio Corp., 475 U.S. 574 (1986), was an antitrust case decided by the Supreme Court of the United States. It raised the standard for surviving summary judgment to unambiguous evidence that tends to exclude an innocent interpretation. Specifically, the issue was whether there was a horizontal "agreement" between Matsushita Electric and other Japanese television manufacturers. The Court held that the evidence must tend to exclude the possibility of independent action to be sufficient to survive summary judgment.

See also
List of United States Supreme Court cases, volume 475

External links
 

United States antitrust case law
United States Supreme Court cases
United States Supreme Court cases of the Burger Court
Panasonic
LG Electronics
1986 in United States case law